Aislaby Quarry is a sandstone quarry in the village of Aislaby, near to Whitby in North Yorkshire, England. The quarry produces sandstone which has been exported through Whitby to London and South East England.

History
The West and East Piers at Whitby were faced with  blocks of Aislaby stone.

Besides being used for building purposes, some of the stone from Aislaby was used in decorative work such as crosses used in churches. Examples of this stone worked decoratively have been found in churches the area including Whitby Abbey, Lythe, Church of St Mary, Lastingham, and Hovingham. The Easby Cross, which dates to the early 9th century, has been matched to the same "medium-grained deltaic sandstone traditionally produced in the Aislaby quarries of Eskdale, near Whitby". It is theorised that pack horses took sections of the stone west from Aislaby to the valley of the River Swale, but it is unknown who paid for the cross.

In May 2002, the quarry was re-opened to allow new stone to be quarried to provide repairs for structures which used Aislaby Stone in the first place, such as the east pier at Scarborough. It was again reopened in the 2010s, specifically to supply stone for a renovation programme on the East and West Piers at Whitby. The quarry was registered in 2020 as Eskdale stone, working sandstone from the Saltwick and Cloughton formations of Jurassic sandstone.

Notable structures
The structures listed below were built with stone quarried at Aislaby (not all structures are entirely of Aislaby stone);

Admiralty Pier, Dover
The new Library, Cambridge University
Church of St Margaret, Aislaby
Covent Garden
Easby Cross
Grinkle Park, Easington
Guisborough Priory
Houghton Hall, King's Lynn, the stone was transported to King's Lynn from Whitby by sea
London Bridge
Ramsgate Pier
St Gregory's Minster, Kirkdale (assumed)
Scarborough North Pier
Strand Bridge (original Waterloo Bridge)
Whitby Abbey
Whitby East Pier
Whitby West Pier
Whitby Town Hall

References

Sources

Quarries in North Yorkshire
Whitby